Şahağac (also, Shakhagach and Sahagaci) is a village and municipality in the Astara Rayon of Azerbaijan.  It has a population of 1000.

References 

Populated places in Astara District